The 1989 FIVB Volleyball Men's Club World Championship was the 1st edition of the event. It was held in Parma, Italy from 9 to 10 December 1989.

Final standing

External links
Honours

1989 FIVB Men's Club World Championship
FIVB Men's Club World Championship
FIVB Men's Club World Championship
FIVB Volleyball Men's Club World Championship
Sport in Parma